Milan Gutović (11 August 1946 – 25 August 2021) was a Serbian and Yugoslav actor, cabaret performer and television personality. He is best known for his portrayal of Srećko Šojić in Tesna koža and Bela lađa.

Early life and education 
Gutović was born on 11 August 1946, in a Belgrade suburban neighborhood of Umka. He graduated from the High School of Electrical Engineering "Nikola Tesla" in Belgrade, where he earned the nickname "Lane". Initially, Gutović wanted to study at the Faculty of Mathematics, although he later enrolled in the Belgrade Academy for theater, cinema, radio and television, from which he graduated in 1967. Later that year, he became a member of the Yugoslav Drama Theatre.

Career

Film and television career 
After becoming a member in the Yugoslav Drama Theatre in 1967, he and other now-prominent actors, became members of the so called "Bojan's babies" club which included actors that were part of a permanent engagement in the Yugoslav Drama Theatre. Gutović's film career began in 1968, in the movie Bekstva. His first main role in a movie was in Mića Milošević's movie Drugarčine, which was recorded in 1979. Two years later, Gutović was contacted by Milošević to act in Laf u srcu where he played Srećko Šojić. Gutović continued his role as Srećko Šojić in Tesna koža ("Tight Skin"), which was recorded in 1982.  His first major role on television was in the comedy series Diplomci, although, he earned more popularity in Bolji Život and Otvorena vrata.

Between 2006 and 2011, he again portrayed Srećko Šojić in Bela lađa ("A White Boat"), which was a loose continuation of Tesna koža. After leaving Bela lađa, he retired.

Cabaret career 
Gutović is also widely known around the world for his A usual evening cabaret, which he performed from the 1990s until his death. His cabaret was the first show played in Serbian in the Broadway theatre.

Besides performing in the National Theatre in Belgrade, he also performed in the Montenegrin National Theatre, Zvezdara Theatre, Slavija Theatre, BITEF and many theatres. Between 2020 and June 2021, he performed in the "Putujuće pozorište Šopalović" show, in the Yugoslav Drama Theatre.

Personal life 
Gutović was married twice, although no information is known about his first wife, with whom he had two sons, Jakov and Spasoje. He was later married to Biljana Knežević between 2001 and 2011. Gutović also had a daughter Milica, an actress and ballerina from his first marriage. Gutović had an older sister called Bojana. Later in his life, he moved to Kumodraž, and in his last years he was often seen camping and fishing.

In 2006, he became a member of the National Theatre in Belgrade, and between 2006 and 2008 he served as the president of the Association of Drama Artists of Serbia.

Gutović was awarded multiple awards, such as "Staueta Ćuran" and "Sterija award" in 1978, "Zoran Radmilović award" in 1988, "Golden Arena award" in 1989, "Nušić award" in 2005, "Car Konstantin award" in 2006, "Raša Plaović award" in 2007 and "Zlatni Ćuran award" in 2020.

He was also an outspoken critic of Serbian president Aleksandar Vučić and his regime.

Death 
In June 2021, Gutović contracted COVID-19 during the COVID-19 pandemic in Serbia and had to cancel all of his shows.

On 19 August 2021, Gutović's health suddenly deteriorated and he was transported to the Military Medical Academy for treatment. A day later, multiple unreliable tabloids published incorrect information that Gutović had died. He died on 25 August 2021, 14 days after his 75th birthday. According to Irfan Mensur, Gutović attended chemotherapy sessions and never gave up fighting.

Filmography

Film

Television

References

External links 
 
 Verbalisti Interview: Lane Gutovic, Anchors are the Murderers of the Serbian Language (VIDEO), PRODIREKT, Management Communication and Development, 7 November 2011 (in Serbian)

1946 births
2021 deaths
Golden Arena winners
Male actors from Belgrade
Serbian male actors
Serbian male Shakespearean actors
Serbian television presenters
Zoran Radmilović Award winners
Deaths from the COVID-19 pandemic in Serbia